Rhye  is an R&B musical project of Canadian singer Mike Milosh. It originally consisted of him and Danish instrumentalist Robin Hannibal. They released the singles "Open" and "The Fall" online without much detail, which led to speculation about the band. Their debut album, Woman, was released on March 4, 2013. In June 2013, the album was longlisted for the 2013 Polaris Music Prize. In 2017, it was reported that Robin Hannibal was no longer a member of Rhye and that the project had evolved into a music collective led by Milosh and focused around the associated live band. Their second album, Blood, was released on February 2, 2018, and was largely written, produced, and performed by Milosh.

In 2018, Rhye began an international tour to promote the album Blood.

Members
Michael Milosh was born in Toronto, Canada, and is an electronic musician and vocalist. He is a classically trained cellist. He moved to Berlin, Germany to pursue music as a vocalist and a producer. Professionally using the name Milosh, he signed with the record label Plug Research and released two albums, You Make Me Feel (2004), and Meme (2006). He also contributed the track "Then It Happened" to the Ghostly International/Williams Street album Ghostly Swim, which was released in 2008.
Robin Hannibal (born Robin Braun) was a member of the Danish duo Quadron together with Coco Maja Hastrup Karshøj. They were also signed to the Plug Research label and released a self-titled album in July 2009. Hannibal was also part of a Danish electronica collective called Boom Clap Bachelors, who in early 2008 released the album Just Before Your Lips. He has collaborated with other artists such as Nobody Beats the Beats, Clemens, Jokeren, and L.O.C. Hannibal also launched two projects, Owusu & Hannibal and Parallel Dance Ensemble, and contributed to Szjerdene's "Lead the Way" and to Leon Ware's "Orchids for the Sun". In 2011, Quadron collaborated with American DJ and record producer Kaskade on the song "Waste Love" off his album Fire & Ice.

History
In 2010, Hannibal was working on some Quadron material and got tipped off about Milosh's work through their common record label. He contacted Milosh, who was at the time living in Berlin, and asked him to fly to Copenhagen, Denmark to meet him. The two musicians spent a week together in the studio recording three tracks for their first collaboration.

Eventually, Hannibal moved to Los Angeles to pursue a career there. As it happened, Milosh had also gone to the States independently. Based on their earlier cooperation in Denmark, the two agreed to continue working together, forming the duo Rhye, initially as an internet-based mystery, posting several singles online, but without providing any background information or contact details. Their online postings for "Open" and "The Fall", both romantic soul-pop numbers, garnered attention and a following. The songs were accompanied by sensual and high-quality shot videos.

There was great interest as well as speculation amongst music journalists and reviewers about the group's identity. Discussions also ensued about Milosh's high and sigh-like contralto androgynous vocals. His voice and the band's instrumentation are likened to those of British-Nigerian singer Sade and The xx.

In 2013, the band released its debut album, Woman.

During their 2014 tour, Rhye sold a poster printed for the Boston show containing cryptic text in Wingdings that read "Who is Rhye. Edward Bernays."

In 2017, Rhye collaborated with Bonobo on a track called "Break Apart" from his album Migration.

In June 2017, Rhye released the split single featuring the songs "Please" and "Summer Days".

In 2018, Rhye released their second album Blood, to largely positive critical feedback. The cover art for the album features Milosh's naked girlfriend (a different woman from the one on the cover of Woman).

Mike Milosh sexual abuse allegations 
In March 2021, Milosh was accused of grooming and sexual abuse by his ex-wife Alexa Nikolas. She alleged Milosh began grooming her for a sexual relationship when she was 16 years old and he was 33, and that during their marriage, he assaulted her. In August 2021, Nikolas filed a lawsuit against Milosh for sexual battery, gender-based violence, and intentional infliction of emotional distress. The lawsuit was dropped by Nikolas in March 2022.

Discography

Studio albums

EPs
The Fall (Remixes) (2012)

Singles
 "Please" (2017)
 "Taste" (2017)
 "Hymn" (2018)
 "Needed" (2019)
 "Beautiful" (2020)
 "Helpless" (2020)
 "Black Rain" (2020)
 "A Quiet Voice" (2023)

Videography

Music videos

References

External links
Official website

Musicians from Toronto
Canadian male singers
Canadian electronic musicians
Downtempo musicians